Tracie Spencer is the debut album of American singer Tracie Spencer, released on June 25, 1988 on Capitol Records.

Overview
At the time of this release, Spencer was 11 years old and noted as the youngest female artist to sign a record deal with a major label. The single "Symptoms of True Love" peaked at No. 38 on the Billboard Hot 100 chart and No. 11 on the Billboard Hot Soul Songs chart. The singles "Hide and Seek" and "Imagine" also reached Nos. 32 and 31 on the Billboard Hot Soul Songs charts.

Track listing
# "Hide and Seek" (Lynn Davis) – 4:33
# "Symptoms of True Love" (Irmgard Klarman, Felix Weber) – 5:05
# "My Heart Beats Only 4 U" (James Allen, Cornelius Mims, John Bokowski) – 4:21
# "In My Dreams" (Larry M. Lee, Ike Stubblefield) – 4:07
# "Imagine" (Lennon) – 4:28
# "Cross My Heart" (Michael Jay, Emily Burton) – 4:41
# "Wanna Be" (Mims, Ollie E. Brown) – 5:20
# "My First Broken Heart" (Dorothy S. Gazeley, Allan Rich) – 4:23
# "Because of You" (Linda Creed, Dennis Matosky, John Lind, Leslie Hall) – 4:32
# "Lullaby Child" (Lisa Haynes, Tony Haynes, Michael O'Hara) – 3:08

Cover versions
"Imagine" is a cover of the John Lennon song. Eighth Wonder and Martika went on to cover her track "Cross My Heart" during the same year. The album track "My First Broken Heart" was covered by Filipina singer Iya Villania on her 2008 album Finally!.

Personnel 
 Tracie Spencer – lead vocals, rap (6)
 John Bokowski – synthesizers, programming 
 Chuckii Booker – synthesizers
 Tom Keane – keyboards, acoustic piano, drums 
 James Allen – programming
 Joe Curiale – synthesizers, programming
 Ron Kersey – keyboards 
 Dennis Matkosky – keyboards, programming 
 Michael O'Hara – keyboards, acoustic piano
 Monty Seward – acoustic piano, synthesizers, programming
 Aaron Smith – programming
 Ike Stubblefield – keyboards, programming 
 David Zeman – synthesizers
 Cornelius Mims – synth bass, backing vocals 
 Bruce Gaitsch – guitars 
 James Harrah – guitars 
 Paul Jackson, Jr. – guitars 
 Josh Leo – guitars
 Johnny McGhee – guitars 
 Greg Moore – guitars 
 Josef Andre Parson – guitars 
 David Williams – guitars 
 Gregg Wright – guitars 
 Jason Scheff – electric bass
 Ollie E. Brown – drums, percussion, programming, special effects, backing vocals, BGV arrangements (5)
 Paulinho da Costa – percussion
 Bobbye Hall – congas
 Bill Jones – saxophones
 Danny Pelfrey – saxophones
 Andrew Woolfolk – saxophones
 Gene Page – string arrangements (5)
 Leonard Caston Jr. – BGV arrangements (5)
 Marva Barnes – backing vocals
 Crystal Blake – backing vocals
 Alex Brown – backing vocals, BGV arrangements (2)
 Carl Carwell – backing vocals 
 Lynn Davis – backing vocals, BGV arrangements (8)
 Vonciele Faggett – backing vocals 
 Natalie Jackson – backing vocals
 Josie James – backing vocals
 Jean Johnson – backing vocals 
 Carol Perry – backing vocals 
 Darlene Perry – backing vocals 
 Lori Perry – backing vocals 
 Sharon Perry – backing vocals 
 Angel Rogers – backing vocals 
 Alfie Silas – backing vocals 
 Cindy Silver – backing vocals 
 Marty Spencer – rap (6)
 Cherri Wells – backing vocals 
 Mona Lisa Young – backing vocals

Production 
 Wayne Edwards – executive producer, co-producer (4)
 Stan Plesser – executive producer, management 
 Ollie E. Brown – producer (1, 3, 5, 6, 7), mixing, special remixing (8, 9)
 Ron Kersey – producer (2)
 Larry Lee – producer (4), recording, mixing
 Ike Stubblefield – producer (4)
 Dennis Matkosky – producer (8, 9, 10), recording 
 Michael O'Hara – producer (10)
 Steve Halquist – recording, mixing, special remixing (8, 9)
 Hill Swimmer – recording, mixing 
 Rob Weaver – recording 
 Bobby Brooks – mixing 
 Taavi Mote – mixing 
 Frank Wolf – mixing 
 Horatio Gordon – assistant engineer
 Mark Herman – assistant engineer
 Roy Kohara – art direction
 Roland Young – art direction
 Shiffman Young – design 
 Dennis Keeley – photography

Chart information

References

1988 debut albums
Tracie Spencer albums
Freestyle music albums
Capitol Records albums